The 1953 Milwaukee Braves season was the 83rd season of the franchise. It saw the return of Major League Baseball to Milwaukee for the first time since 1901 when Braves team owner Lou Perini, due to very low attendance, moved the team to Milwaukee, Wisconsin.  This move was approved by all seven fellow National League owners and occurred during spring training, just weeks prior to the start of 

In their first season in the Badger State, the Braves finished in second place in the National League standings, with a  record, thirteen games behind the NL Champion Brooklyn Dodgers.

At the new County Stadium, the Braves drew a then-NL record  The previous year in Boston, the home attendance for the season was

Move of Braves from Boston to Milwaukee 

Construction began on Milwaukee County Stadium in 1950 in hopes of both luring a Major League baseball team and also the Packers football team from Green Bay.  The minor league Milwaukee Brewers were scheduled to begin play at the start of the 1953 season.

However, in the first move of a Major League team in half a century, on March 18, 1953, the National League approved owner Lou Perini's move of the Braves to Milwaukee 8-0 because of his "fine standing" with the other owners and also because there was an open city for his minor league team then in Milwaukee.  The minor league Brewers moved to Toledo, Ohio, and changed their name to the Mudhens.

Braves manager Charlie Grimm had won two minor league pennants while in Milwaukee (one with the Cubs farm team and the second with the Braves farm team in 1951).  In addition, the Braves organization promoted him from their Milwaukee farm team to the MLB Boston Braves the summer of 1952.  Furthermore, 21 of 40 players on the Braves starting roster had played at least some of their minor league careers in Milwaukee.

Milwaukee County gave the Braves a favorable stadium deal.  For the first two years, the team would pay only $1,000 a year for the use of Milwaukee County Stadium.  For the next three years, the team would pay 5% of ticket prices and concessions.  After that, the rent would be negotiated afresh with the Braves being required open their books.

At the time of the move, the Braves owner Lou Perini said, "A third major league is the only answer for the future."  This did not come to pass.  In spite of the Mexican League attracting some MLB players in the 1940s, from 1953 to the present (2021) professional baseball in the United States continued to have only two major leagues: the National League and the American League.

Regular season

Season standings

Opening game
The Braves moved from Boston to Milwaukee on March 18, 1953, less than four weeks before the start of the regular season, causing the National League to quickly realign its  schedule. Before 1953, the NL was divided into four Eastern teams (Boston, Brooklyn, New York, Philadelphia) and four "Western" ones (Chicago, Cincinnati, Pittsburgh, St. Louis). With the Milwaukee Braves now a Western club, they exchanged 1953 schedules with the Pittsburgh Pirates, and opened their season on the road against the Cincinnati Redlegs in the traditional NL opener at Crosley Field on Monday, April 13.  Braves' starting pitcher Max Surkont threw a three-hit shutout, however, and Sid Gordon and Jack Dittmer drove in the only runs of the day, as Milwaukee triumphed, 2–0. The following day, April 14, they opened at home before 34,357 fans, and in ten innings they defeated the St. Louis Cardinals at Milwaukee County Stadium, 3–2. Warren Spahn earned the complete game victory.

Starting lineup, April 13, 1953

Record vs. opponents

Roster

Player stats

Batting

Starters by position 
Note: Pos = Position; G = Games played; AB = At bats; H = Hits; Avg. = Batting average; HR = Home runs; RBI = Runs batted in

Other batters 
Note: G = Games played; AB = At bats; H = Hits; Avg. = Batting average; HR = Home runs; RBI = Runs batted in

Pitching

Starting pitchers 
Note: G = Games pitched; IP = Innings pitched; W = Wins; L = Losses; ERA = Earned run average; SO = Strikeouts

Other pitchers 
Note: G = Games pitched; IP = Innings pitched; W = Wins; L = Losses; ERA = Earned run average; SO = Strikeouts

Relief pitchers 
Note: G = Games pitched; W = Wins; L = Losses; SV = Saves; ERA = Earned run average; SO = Strikeouts

Farm system 

LEAGUE CHAMPIONS: Wichita Falls, Quebec

References 

1953 Milwaukee Braves season at Baseball Reference

Milwaukee Braves seasons
Milwaukee Braves season
Milwau